Marshall Township is an inactive township in Saline County, in the U.S. state of Missouri.

Marshall Township was erected in 1841, taking its name from the community of Marshall, Missouri.

References

Townships in Missouri
Townships in Saline County, Missouri